In law, a verdict is the formal finding of fact made by a jury.

Verdict or The Verdict may also refer to:

Arts, entertainment, and media

Characters
Verdict (comics), a fictional superhero team

Films
 The Verdict (1925 film), an American mystery silent film directed by Fred Windemere 
 The Verdict (1946 film), an American film noir directed by Don Siegel
 The Verdict (1959 film), a French drama directed by Jean Valère
 The Verdict (1964 film), a British crime drama film, part of the Edgar Wallace Mysteries series
 Verdict (1974 film), a French-Italian drama starring Sophia Loren
 The Verdict, a 1982 film starring Paul Newman
 The Verdict (2013 film), a Belgian drama directed by Jan Verheyen
 Verdict (2019 film), a Filipino film

Literature
 Verdict (play), a 1958 play by Agatha Christie
 The Verdict (1980), a novel by Barry Reed, basis for the 1982 film

Music
 The Verdict (The Jacka album), 2012
 The Verdict (Queensrÿche album), 2019

Periodicals
 The Verdict, a magazine published by Justia
 The Verdict, the current-day Present Truth Magazine, an evangelical Christian periodical
 Verdict, a technology news website owned by GlobalData

Television

Series
 Verdict (TV series), a 1998 British series
 The Verdict (2007 TV series), a 2007 reality legal series
 The Verdict (Australian TV program), a 2015 Australian talk show

Episodes
 "The Verdict" (American Crime Story)
 "The Verdict" (Dynasty 1981)
 "The Verdict" (Dynasty 1984)
 "The Verdict" (Matlock)
 "The Verdict" (Modern Family)